This is a list of Dutch television related events from 1971.

Events

Debuts

Television shows

1950s
NOS Journaal (1956–present)
Pipo de Clown (1958-1980)

Ending this year

Stiefbeen en Zoon

Births
18 January - Peggy Jane de Schepper, actress
22 January - Wendy van Dijk, actress & TV presenter
31 January - Sylvana Simons, TV & radio presenter
10 June - Reinout Oerlemans, actor, director, TV presenter & producer

Deaths